Tropical Storm Omeka was the latest forming Eastern Pacific named storm since reliable records began in the 1960s. The storm was part of the 2010 Pacific typhoon and hurricane season. On December 18, 2010, the Central Pacific Hurricane Center (CPHC) began monitoring a subtropical cyclone near the International Dateline for possible tropical cyclogenesis. Over the following two days, the system tracked southwestward, entering the Western Pacific basin. It then began to transition into a tropical cyclone. Shortly before crossing the dateline on December 20, the CPHC assessed the system to have become a tropical storm. The storm was assigned the name Omeka several hours later as it moved into the CPHC's area of responsibility – which is from 140°W to the International Dateline. Upon doing so, Omeka attained its peak intensity with winds of 60 mph (100 km/h). Later on December 20, wind shear in the region increased, causing the system to weaken. By December 21, the center of Omeka was devoid of convection and dissipated on the next day. Omeka brushed Lisianski Island but caused no damage.

Meteorological history

The origins of Omeka were from an extratropical cyclone in the western Pacific Ocean. The storm tracked southeastward near the International Dateline, and by December 18 it transitioned into a kona storm and soon into a subtropical cyclone. A large, sprawling system, little development was initially expected to take place as the storm moved towards the southwest. As the low moved over warmer waters, the cyclone was able to maintain an area of deep convection near its center. According to the CPHC, the system was nearly fully tropical early on December 19 as it moved west of the dateline. However, the Joint Typhoon Warning Center (JTWC) considered the low to be fully subtropical as a cold-core was present over the center of circulation. Later on December 19, the Japan Meteorological Agency (JMA) classified the system as a tropical depression as the low turned towards the southeast. Early on December 20, the JMA issued their final advisory on the depression as it moved east of the dateline and reentered the CPHC's area of responsibility.

Already classifying it as a tropical storm, the Central Pacific Hurricane Center (CPHC) issued their first advisory on the system at 0900 UTC on December 20, at which time it was situated roughly 505 miles (815 km) south of Midway Island. Upon issuing this advisory, they designated the system as Tropical Storm Omeka, the first named storm of the Central Pacific season. The storm generally tracked towards the northeast, in response to a mid-level low to the west, throughout the remainder of its existence. Traversing an area of decreased sea surface temperatures and increasing wind shear, Omeka quickly weakened to a minimal tropical storm later on December 20, with winds of 40 miles per hour (65 km/h). Intermittent bursts of convection allowed the system to maintain gale-force winds through December 21; however, persistent shear finally took its toll later that morning. Between 0700 and 0800 UTC, Omeka brushed Lisianski Island. Omeka's extratropical remnant dissipated on December 23.

Impact and records
On December 21, the center of Omeka brushed Lisianski Island, with winds of 40 miles per hour (65 km/h). However, no tropical storm watches or warnings were issued since the CPHC anticipated weakening prior to the storm passing the island.

At the time, Omeka was judged to have existed in the northeast Pacific later than any other storm since the 1960s, when reliable records begin in the basin. However, according to the CPHC's database, there are two possible tropical cyclones in 1903 and 1904 which developed on December 23. In addition, even though it did not strengthen into a tropical storm, Tropical Depression Nine-C of the 2015 Pacific hurricane season formed later in the calendar year than Omeka, forming on December 31, 2015 and dissipating the next day.

Omeka was the first December storm in the Central Pacific since Tropical Storm Paka in 1997.  Throughout 2010, the entire Pacific Ocean experienced record-low tropical cyclone activity due to a strong 2010–12 La Niña event. Since Omeka was the first storm in the Central Pacific during the year, it marked the latest start to a season since reliable records began, excluding seasons with no storms.

See also

Kona storm
1951 Hawaii cyclone
Tropical Storm Haiyan (2007)
2006 Central Pacific cyclone
List of off-season Pacific hurricanes
 Subtropical Storm 96C

References

External links

The Central Pacific Hurricane Center's Advisory Archive for Tropical Storm Omeka

2010 Pacific hurricane season
Eastern Pacific tropical storms
Off-season Eastern Pacific tropical cyclones
Omeka